Mark McMahon may refer to:

 Mark McMahon (American football), University of Oklahoma football coach
 Mark McMahon (bowls) (born 1970), Scottish bowls player